Percent is the eighth extended play by South Korean girl group Apink, released by Play M Entertainment on January 7, 2019. The EP features six tracks, with "%% (Eung Eung)" serving as the title track.

Track listing

Composition
Billboard's Tamar Herman defines the title track "%% (Eung Eung)" as a lush, ‘80s-influenced dance track.

Awards and nominations

Accolades

Commercial performance
The EP debuted at number three on the Gaon Album Chart in South Korea.

Charts

References

2019 EPs
Korean-language EPs
Apink albums
Kakao M EPs